Chrome Children Vol. 2 is a follow-up to the 2006 album, Chrome Children. It is a co-production between Stones Throw Records and Adult Swim. It is available as a free downloadable EP on the Adult Swim website. It was also released in an unedited form on iTunes.

Track listing 

"Chrome Dreams"
Performed by Madlib the Beat Konducta
Produced by Madlib
"Rhymes with an L"
Performed by M.E.D.
Produced by Dabrye
Cuts by J. Rocc
"Livin'In the City"
 Performed by Roc C
Produced by Oh No
"Stay with Me (Instrumental)"
Performed by Chocolate Star
Produced by Gary Davis
"Reverse Part Two (Koushik Remix)"
Performed by Percee P
Produced by Koushik
Cuts by J. Rocc
"Get Back"
Performed by Oh No
Produced by Decyphur
"Money Motivated Movements"
Performed by Guilty Simpson
Produced by Four Tet
Cuts by J. Rocc
"Selah's Children"
Performed by Madlib the Beat Konducta
Produced by Madlib
"Theme (Danny Breaks Remix)"
Performed by Baron Zen
Produced by Danny Breaks
"Happy Now?"
Performed by Aloe Blacc
Produced by Four Tet
"Bubbha's Dance"
Performed by J. Rocc
Produced by J. Rocc
Cuts by J. Rocc
"Soul Traveling"
Performed by Gary Wilson
Produced by Gary Wilson
"Keep Running Away (Egon's Edit)"
Performed by Clifford Nyren
Produced by Clifford Nyren
"Marcus, Martin and Malcolm"
Performed by The Jazzistics
Produced by Yesterdays New Quintet
"Murder"
Performed by James Pants
Produced by James Pants
"Strange Life"
Performed by Arabian Prince
Produced by Arabian Prince

Samples
 "Livin' in the City" contains samples from:
 "Livin' in the City" performed by The Melton Brothers, featuring Alfie Moss
 "Reverse Part Two [Koushik Remix]" contains samples from:
 "Yaz Gazeteci Yaz" performed by Selda
 "Ince Ince" performed by Selda
 "Bubbha's Dance" contains samples from:
 "The Phantom" performed by Bubbha Thomas

External links
 Chrome Children Vol. 2 at adultswim.com
 Chrome Children Vol. 2 at www.stonesthrow.com

Albums produced by Madlib
2007 compilation albums
Adult Swim compilation albums
Stones Throw Records compilation albums